{{Infobox deity
| type = Yoruba
| other_names = Orunmila or Orunmilá; Orúnla or Orúla or Agbonniregun| member_of = Orisha
| venerated_in = Yoruba religion
| image = 
| caption = 
| deity_of = Wisdom, Knowledge, Ifa Divination, Fate, Destiny, Prophecy & first Babalawo
| color = 
| region = Nigeria, Benin, Latin America
| ethnic_group = Yoruba
| symbol = Ifa divination
| parents = Alayeru and Oroko
}}

Ọrunmila (also Ọrúnla or Orúla in  Latin America) is the Orisha of wisdom, knowledge, and divination & the first Babalawo.

Historical and literary sources
Following the categories developed by the Nigerian scholar Joseph Omosade Awolalu, Orunmila is recognized as a primordial Orisha, an ara orun, one that existed before the creation of humanity and resides in Heaven, as opposed to irun-male or irunmole, sacred beings living on Earth.

He is praise named "Igbákejì Olódùmarè" (second in command to Olodumare) and "Ẹlẹ́rìí ìpín" (witness of fate). Priests of Ifá are known as babalawos and Priestesses of Ifá are known as iyanifas.

Orunmila is considered a sage, recognizing that Olodumare placed Ori (intuitive knowledge) in him as a prime Orisha. It is Ori who can intercede and affect the reality of a person much more than any other Orisha.

Priesthood and initiation
Awo in every tradition study the 256 Odu; each Odu is traditionally considered to include stories and prayers that have been passed down from the time that Orunmila walked the Earth as a prophet.

Some initiatory lineages have only male priests of Orunmila, while other lineages include female priestesses. The term "Awo", meaning "secret" is a gender-neutral title for an initiated priest of Orunmila. The debate surrounding gender is a result of diversity in the history of Ifá in various locations. In Latin America and some areas of West Africa, only men may become full priests of Orunmila, while in other regions of West Africa the priesthood is open to women. Ifá practitioners believe in duality in life: males exist because of the female essence and females exist because of the male essence, so every major rite or ceremony includes both genders.

Every Ifá stanza has one portion dedicated to the issue of teaching the Iwa that Ifá supports. This Iwa, which Ifá teaches transcends religious doctrine, is central to every human being, and imparts communal, social and civic responsibility that Olodumare supports. Of great importance to this is the theme of righteousness and practicing good moral behavior.

See also 
 Ifá

References

Resources
 Chief S. Solagbade Popoola & Fakunle Oyesanya, Ikunle Abiyamo: The ASE of Motherhood 2007. 
 Chief S. Solagbade Popoola Library, INC Ifa Dida Volume One (EjiOgbe - Orangun Meji) 
 Chief S. Solagbade Popoola Library, INC Ifa Dida Volume Two (OgbeYeku - OgbeFun) 
 Chief S. Solagbade Popoola Library, INC Ifa Dida Volume Three (OyekuOgbe - OyekuFun)  
 James J. Kulevich, "The Odu of Lucumi: Information on all 256 Odu Ifa"
Ayele Fa'seguntunde' Kumari, Iyanifa:Women of Wisdom   

Yoruba gods
Traditional African religions
Afro-American religion
Yoruba deities
Divination
Wisdom gods
Oracular gods